Mark Lowell Wilson (born 1947) is an American philosopher and Distinguished Professor of Philosophy at University of Pittsburgh. Wilson has authored several books on the philosophy of mathematics.

Education and early life 
Wilson was raised in Oregon, and enrolled at Reed College between 1965 and 1967, before earning his bachelor's degree in 1969 from the University of Washington. He completed a doctorate at Harvard University in 1976, where his thesis was supervised by Hilary Putnam.

Academic career 
Before joining the University of Pittsburgh faculty, where he was named distinguished professor of philosophy in 2015, Wilson taught at the University of California, San Diego, University of Illinois at Chicago, and Ohio State University.

His research mainly focuses on how physical and mathematical concerns become entangled with metaphysics and philosophy of language. He has published several books, including Imitation of Rigor: An Alternate History of Analytic Philosophy, Innovation and Certainty, Wandering Significance: An Essay on Conceptual Behavior, and Physics Avoidance: and other essays in conceptual strategy. He is a Resident Fellow of the Center for Philosophy of Science at the University of Pittsburgh and a Fellow of the American Academy of Arts and Sciences.

Bibliography

References 

21st-century American philosophers
21st-century American male writers
Living people
Place of birth missing (living people)
University of Pittsburgh faculty
Fellows of the American Academy of Arts and Sciences
Philosophers from Pennsylvania
University of California, San Diego faculty
Reed College alumni
20th-century American philosophers
1947 births
University of Washington alumni
Harvard University alumni
University of Illinois Chicago faculty
Ohio State University faculty
Philosophers from Oregon
Philosophers of mathematics
American philosophy academics